Mátraszentimre is a village in Heves County, Northern Hungary Region, Hungary.

Parts of the village
 Mátraszentimre
 Mátraszentistván
 Mátraszentlászló
 Bagolyirtás
 Fallóskút
 Galyatető

Sights to visit
  The catholic church
 Slovak country house
 Ski resort in Mátraszentistván
 Lookout tower on the Galya-tető mountain
 Mineral Museum

Gallery

See also
 List of populated places in Hungary

References

External links
 Mátraszentimre Önkormányzatának honlapja
 Mátraszentimre az utazom.com honlapján
 Légifotók Mátraszentimréről
 Sok-sok fotó a környékről
 Mátraszentimre a funiq.hu-n
 

Populated places in Heves County